Henry Sandford (died 1235) was a bishop of Rochester.

Henry Sandford may also refer to:

 Henry Sandford (1671–1733), Irish MP for the borough of Roscommon
 Henry Sandford (1719–1796), Irish MP for County Roscommon and the boroughs of Kildare and Carrick
 Henry Sandford, 1st Baron Mount Sandford (1751–1814), Irish MP for the borough of Roscommon
 Henry Sandford, 2nd Baron Mount Sandford (1805–1828), of the Barons Mount Sandford